Sain Wari is a border town in Ghotki district, Sindh, in Pakistan.  It is close to the India-Pakistan border.

References 

Geography of Sindh